James Joseph Maher  (1888 – 28 July 1964) was a New Zealand politician of the National Party.

Life and politics

Maher was born in 1888 in Palmerston North. He received his education at a local school until age 12, when his father died and he became a farm worker. He then went sharemilking, and leased a farm at Mangaroa, which he later purchased. He was the inaugural president of the Town Milk Supplies Board from 1943, chaired the Wellington Dairy Farmers Co-op Association, was a member of the Hutt Valley Council, a member of the Hutt Valley Power Board, and was a treasurer of Federated Farmers in 1948.

Maher represented the  electorate until he retired in 1960. Allan McCready his son-in-law succeeded to the Otaki seat.

In the 1962 Queen's Birthday Honours, Maher was appointed an Officer of the Order of the British Empire, for services to the community. He died on 28 July 1964.

Notes

References

1888 births
1964 deaths
New Zealand National Party MPs
New Zealand MPs for North Island electorates
Members of the New Zealand House of Representatives
New Zealand farmers
People from Upper Hutt
Unsuccessful candidates in the 1943 New Zealand general election
New Zealand Officers of the Order of the British Empire